The Church of Saint Athanasius is a post-Byzantine church located in Metaxades, Evros in Greece. Thought to be built in 1695, it is an important religious monument for the residents of the area. The church opens its gates twice a year on the feast of Saint Athanasius and its architecture is unique to the Metaxades region.

Along with the post-Byzantine church of Saint Athanasius in Metaxades, there are Saint Athanasius in Alepochori (1729) and Saint Pantaleon in Paliouri (~18th century), all from the same era.

History 
The vicar of Church Prophet Ilias of Metaxades, Father Iakovos Arnautidis, has stated that much of the hagiography of the church has been lost due to the passage of time and human intervention. Additionally, the church is deteriorating as its walls recede and water enters from the roof. Although the church is not well known in scientific literature, the cemetery to its north and east is considered the oldest and best-preserved in Evros, with the oldest inscription dating back to 1691.

Father Arnautidis has emphasized the importance of preserving the church as a monument to the region, and archaeologists Athanasius Brikas and Konstantinos Tsouris have highlighted the rarity of post-Byzantine churches surviving in western Thrace before 1800. The Church of Saint Athanasius, whose foundation date is lost, is mentioned in records from 1692 to 1697, and the surviving iconography of the church can be dated to around 1700.

Sources suggest that the frescoes in the church may have been created by a refugee from Constantinople before or after the Fall, and that the church itself may be much older, possibly dating back to the 11th century. Evidence for this includes an icon of the Virgin Mary from the 15th century and a Cross from the 16th century. The presence of the church during the Turkish occupation is a testament to religious faith and worship, and its significance endures to this day.

References 

Didymoteicho
Buildings and structures in Evros (regional unit)
Churches completed in 1695
15th-century churches in Greece
16th-century churches in Greece
Eastern Orthodox church buildings in Greece
17th-century Eastern Orthodox church buildings